Christophorus Valdarfer was an early printer, active in Venice and Milan in the second half of the fifteenth century.

References

15th-century printers
Italian printers